Marilyn Dumont (born 1955) is a Canadian poet and educator of Cree/Métis descent.

Born in northeastern Alberta, she is a descendant of Gabriel Dumont. Dumont holds an MFA from the University of British Columbia. Her work is widely anthologized. She is currently an Associate Professor at the University of Alberta in the Faculty of Arts - English & Film Studies Department and teaches creative writing.

Bibliography
A Really Good Brown Girl. London, ON: Brick, 1996. 
Green Girl Dreams Mountains. Lantzville, BC: Oolichan Books, 2001.
that tongued belonging. Cape Croker ON: Kegedonce Press, 2007
 in German: diese Zugehörigkeit durch die Zunge, in: Heute sind wir hier. We Are Here Today. A Bilingual Collection of Contemporary Aboriginal Literature(s) from Canada. ed. Hartmut Lutz. Publisher: M.u.H. von der Linden, Wesel 2009 
 Ed. Initiations: a Selection of Young Native Writings. Penticton: Theytus Books, 2007.

Awards
1997: Gerald Lampert Award, A Really Good Brown Girl
2001: Alberta Book Award for Poetry, Green Girl Dreams Mountains
2001: Writer's Guild of Alberta Stephan G. Stephansson Award for Poetry, Green Girl Dreams Mountains
2007: McNally Robinson Aboriginal Book of the Year Award, That Tongued Belonging
2019: Alberta Lieutenant Governor’s Distinguished Artist Award

Notable criticism
 Barkwell, Lawrence J.: Marilyn Dumont, in Women of the Métis Nation. Winnipeg: Louis Riel Institute, 2010. 
 Patrick Schmitz: The aspect of healing in the poetry of Gregory Scofield, Marilyn Dumont, Roo Borson and Louise Bernice Halfe. Grin, Munich 2012  
 Vesna Lopičić: The devil’s language of Marilyn Dumont. . In: Neohelicon, Springer (Netherlands) March 2017, pp 1–12, print:

External links
Brock University: Canadian Women Poets
 Item at English-Canadian writers, Athabasca University, added: bibliography by and about her

References 

1955 births
Living people
20th-century Canadian poets
21st-century Canadian poets
Canadian women poets
Métis writers
Canadian Métis people
20th-century Canadian women writers
21st-century Canadian women writers